Lieutenant-General Albert Fytche CSI (21 September 1820 – 16 June 1892) was a British Indian Army officer who served as Chief Commissioner of the British Crown Colony of Burma from February 1867 to April 1871. Educated at Rugby School and commissioned in the 1830s, he was promoted to captain in the 1840s. A string of promotions followed: major in 1853, lieutenant-colonel in 1862, colonel in 1864, major-general in 1868 and lieutenant-general in 1877.

The bird Bambusicola fytchii is named in his honour.

He was the son of John Fytche of Thorpe Hall, Hoxne, Suffolk, and Anne Wilson. He was a descendant of Ralph Fitch and William Fytche. His father's sister, Elizabeth, married Rev. George Clayton Tennyson, making him a first cousin of Alfred, Lord Tennyson, to whom he dedicated his book, Burma, Past and Present.

Works
  Volume I Volume II

References

External links
 World Statesmen

1820 births
1892 deaths
People educated at Rugby School
Companions of the Order of the Star of India
Administrators in British Burma
British Indian Army generals
19th-century British writers